Walter Lynch (1595-1663 was an Irish prelate who served as Bishop of Clonfert in the seventeenth century.

He arrived in Ireland in 1647; and was appointed on 11 March 1647 and consecrated on 9 April 1648. He left Ireland in 1648 and spent the rest of his life in Hungary. Lynch died on 14 July 1663.

References

Roman Catholic bishops of Clonfert
17th-century Roman Catholic bishops in Ireland
1663 deaths
1595 births